The Four-man event of the FIBT World Championships 2015 was held on 7–8 March 2015.

Results
The first two runs were started on 7 March at 13:15 and the last two runs on 8 March at 15:00.

References

Four-man